Guanolichidae is a family of mites belonging to the order Sarcoptiformes.

Genera:
 Guanolichoides Fain, 1979
 Guanolichus Fain, 1968
 Neoguanolichus Fain, 1979

References 

Acari